The Elusive Chanteuse Show was the two-legged and eighth headlining concert tour by American singer-songwriter Mariah Carey. It was launched in support of her fourteenth studio album, Me. I Am Mariah... The Elusive Chanteuse (2014).  The tour began in Tokyo, Japan on October 4, 2014 and concluded in Brisbane, Australia on November 16, 2014.

Background and development
In December 2012, Carey's manager Randy Jackson confirmed that the singer would embark on a world tour following the release of her fourteenth studio album in 2013. Following her departure as a judge on the U.S. singing competition show American Idol in May 2013, Carey's management confirmed that the singer was busy "putting the finishing touches" on the untitled album, performing at the Macy's Fourth of July Fireworks display and appearing in Lee Daniels film The Butler. In the same statement, in announced plans for a world tour to begin in Asia in October that year.

In an official announcement via the singer's website, Carey wrote the following in regards to her feelings and expectations on the tour: "I want to experience the spontaneity and emotion that I put into this album on stage with my fans," says Carey. "I can't stop writing songs so don't be surprised if you hear a brand new song that I just wrote the night before the show in your city!". The tour was finally announced to begin from October 4, 2014, at the Makuhari Messe Arena and subsequent dates throughout China, Japan and Philippines. Further dates were added for an Australian and New Zealand leg, starting from November.

Synopsis

 The main stage was a one level affair, with a large screen backing the singer, which would play exclusive clips, and footage from old video clips from the singers catalogue. The 'cartoon Mariah' from the Heartbreaker video clip was reintroduced, and played for I'm That Chick and Heartbreaker. During Carey's first show of the tour, she was using a signature 'butterfly' microphone, however, it broke on the first night and was not continued in other shows. In select shows, Carey brought her kids, Moroccan and Monroe out on stage during 'Supernatural', which was written about the two. Like always, dancers were used on the tour, with Carey often joining in the dancing.

During some shows, Carey sang All I Want for Christmas Is You and wore a 'Mrs. Claus' outfit. 
During her song, Thirsty, Carey would make trips around the audience with security guards, allowing the performer to be closer to the audience than ever before. Carey's costumes varied each show, usually staying somewhat similar.

Critical response 

Kenneth Chaw from The Star praised the performance in Kuala Lumpur writing that "it was clear the vocalist remains a master of her trade." Natasha Ann Zachariah from The Straits Times gave a positive review for the performance in Singapore, writing the singer "hit those delicious high octaves with ease, giving goosebumps, of the good kind." Alexa Villano from the Rappler wrote the singer's performance in Manila "gave Filipino fans a show they wouldn't soon forget at the Mall of Asia Arena." Candice Barnes from The Sydney Morning Herald gave the performance in Perth three stars writing the singer "seemed to enjoy making fun of herself, something well-received by the crowd, but delivered a few passive aggressive rants which hinted at her diva reputation."

Matt Gilbertson from The Advertiser gave a positive review of the performance in Adelaide writing "the voice that we all came to adore throughout the ‘90s was back. She even hit those famous, piercingly high ‘whistle notes’ during "Emotions". Shuk-Wah Chung from The Guardian gave the performance in Sydney four out of five stars writing Carey "instantly redeemed herself with a trill here, a whispery vocal there and a gentle caress of those signature curves." Joanna Hunkin from The New Zealand Herald gave a positive review for the performance in Auckland writing Carey hit "the supersonic high notes" and "performed those signature vocal gymnastics with relative ease." Suzanne Simonot from The Daily Telegraph praised the performance in Brisbane writing the singer "hasn't just got it, she flaunts it.".

Set list 

"Across 110th Street" (Introduction)
"Fantasy" (Bad Boy Remix)
"Touch My Body"
"Shake It Off"
"Emotions"
"Cry."
"Fly Like a Bird"
"My All"
"Heartbreaker (contains elements from "Desert Storm Remix")
"#Beautiful"
"I'm That Chick"
"Honey" (So So Def Remix)
"Thirsty"
"Meteorite" 
"Supernatural"
"Hero"
"Always Be My Baby"
"Butterfly Reprise" (Interlude)
"We Belong Together" (outro contains elements of Desert Storm Remix)

Shows

Personnel 
James "Big Jim" Wright – musical director
Daniel Moore II - keyboards
Derrieux Edgecombe – keyboards
Lance Tolbert - bass
Joshua Baker – drums
Trey Lorenz – background vocals
Mary Ann Tatum – background vocals
Takeytha Johnson – background vocals

References

2014 concert tours
Mariah Carey concert tours